Jonathan Davis (born 4 November 1960) is a British fencer from Northern Ireland. He competed in the foil events at the 1988 and 1992 Summer Olympics.

References

External links
 

1960 births
Living people
British male fencers
Olympic fencers of Great Britain
Fencers at the 1988 Summer Olympics
Fencers at the 1992 Summer Olympics
People from Dungannon